Abu Said ibn Khalef ibn Yahia Al-Tamimi Al-Baji, commonly known as Sidi Bou Said (1156–1231) was a Tunisian Sufi scholar (wali). A disciple of Abu Madyan, he is mostly remembered for being Abul Hasan ash-Shadhili's teacher during his stay in Tunisia. He likely met with the Andalusian philosopher Ibn Arabi during his pilgrimage and few-years stay in Damascus and Mecca.

In January 2013, a fire of criminal origin was set to his shrine. This came only a few days after threats from some Salafists who were demanding that access to the shrine be banned as they consider it to be idolatry practice to visit tombs.

The district of Sidi Bou Said in Tunis is named after him.

References

1156 births
1231 deaths
12th-century Arabs
13th-century Arabs
12th-century people of Ifriqiya
13th-century people of Ifriqiya
People from the Almohad Caliphate